Sintsovo is a rural locality (a village) in Posyolok Urshelsky, Gus-Khrustalny District, Vladimir Oblast, Russia. The population was 20 as of 2010.

Geography 
Sintsovo is located 30 km west of Gus-Khrustalny (the district's administrative centre) by road. Vasilevo is the nearest rural locality.

References 

Rural localities in Gus-Khrustalny District